The  is a Japanese comics award recognizing achievement in manga. It is awarded annually to a manga series published in the previous calendar year of eight or fewer collected volumes in length. The Manga Taishō was founded with the aim of recognizing new and relatively unestablished manga, and to provide a platform to promote these works to new readers. To this end, the prize utilizes a judging criteria of recognizing manga one would "want to recommend to friends", rather than a strictly meritocratic evaluation of artistic excellence.

The prize is presented by the Manga Taishō Executive Committee, a volunteer group of roughly one hundred "manga lovers from all walks of life", primarily bookstore workers who manage in-store manga sections. Individuals directly involved with the manga industry, such as manga artists, authors, book designers, and editors, are barred from sitting on the committee; this distinguishes the Manga Taishō from the majority of the other major manga industry awards, which are typically organized by a specific publishing company and voted on by the company's editors. The Manga Taishō was established by Nippon Broadcasting System news announcer , who sought to create a prize as a manga equivalent of the Japan Booksellers' Award, a similarly structured award which recognizes literature. 

The voting system, also based on that of the Japan Booksellers' Award, is divided into two rounds. In the first round, each committee member nominates five titles, and the top ten titles are shortlisted for the prize. In the event of a tie, both titles are nominated and the shortlist is lengthened; the largest shortlist was in 2012, with fifteen nominees. The second round is a ranked vote, where each member reads each nominated work at their own expense, and selects their top three choices in order of preference. Points are assigned based on rank (three points for first preference, two for second, one for third), the rankings are aggregated, and the title with the most points wins. Winning titles cannot be re-nominated in subsequent years. The Manga Taishō does not award a cash prize, though winning titles are promoted heavily in bookstores across Japan; the prize is thus recognized as being a significant sales driver for manga, and winning titles are frequently adapted into anime or television dramas. 

Since its inception, the Manga Taishō has been awarded annually, with fifteen winners as of 2022. Akiko Higashimura is the most-nominated author, with seven lifetime nominations including her win for Blank Canvas: My So-Called Artist's Journey in 2015. The highest-scoring series in the prize's history is Chihayafuru by Yuki Suetsugu, which won the Manga Taishō in 2009 with 102 points; 2009's runner-up, Space Brothers by Chūya Koyama, is the highest-scoring series in the prize's history to not win the Manga Taishō, with 94 points. Delicious in Dungeon is the most-nominated series, with a total of four nominations; its author  is the most-nominated author without a win, with six total. No author has won the award multiple times.

Winners and nominees

Multiple nominations

Works

Authors

References

External links
  

 
2008 establishments in Japan
Manga awards
Annual events in Japan
Awards established in 2008
Comics awards
Recurring events established in 2008